John Lawrence Bevan (10 May 1846 – 31 March 1918) was an Australian cricketer. He played one first-class match for South Australia in 1877/88. It was South Australia's inaugural first-class match. Despite taking 14 wickets at an average of 4.21, and South Australia's innings victory over Tasmania, he never played first-class cricket again. He did, however, play a number of non-first-class matches for South Australia between 1877 and 1882.

See also
 List of South Australian representative cricketers

References

External links
 

1846 births
1918 deaths
Australian cricketers
South Australia cricketers
Cricketers from Swansea